The Nordwestkreuz Frankfurt is a cloverleaf interchange in Frankfurt. Here, the Bundesautobahn 5 (Hattenbacher Dreieck - Frankfurt am Main - Basel) and the Bundesautobahn 66 (Wiesbaden - Fulda) intersect. Roadways and bridges to L3005 from Rödelheim to Eschborn are also integrated into the interchange.

References

Road interchanges in Germany
Roads in Hesse